This is a list of Australian television-related events, debuts, finales, and cancellations that are scheduled to occur in 2018, the 63rd year of continuous operation of television in Australia.

Events

January

February

March

April

May

June

July

September

October

November

December

Television channels

New channels 
2 September – Sky News on WIN
1 October – Your Money
1 December - 7food network

Renamed channels 

 31 October - Eleven to 10 Peach, One to 10 Boss
 17 November - Food Network to SBS Food
 10 December - 10 Boss to 10 Bold

Channel closures 
31 January – World Movies
28 February – Eurosport News, FX, Nat Geo People

Premieres 
Television programs which debut for the first time on Australian television.

Domestic series

International series

Programming changes

Changes to channel affiliation 
Criterion for inclusion in the following list is that Australian premiere episodes will air in Australia for the first time on a new channel. This includes when a program is moved from a free-to-air channel's primary channel to a digital multi-channel, as well as when a program moves between subscription television channels – provided the preceding criterion is met. Ended television series which change networks for repeat broadcasts are not included in the list.

Free-to-air premieres 
This is a list of programs which made their premiere on Australian free-to-air television that had previously premiered on Australian subscription television. Programs may still air on the original subscription television network.

Subscription premieres 
This is a list of programs which made their debut on Australian subscription television, having previously premiered on Australian free-to-air television. Programs may still air (first or repeat) on the original free-to-air television channel.

Returning programs 
Australian produced programs which are returning with a new season after being absent from television in the previous calendar year.

Endings

Deaths

See also 
 2018 in Australia
 List of Australian films of 2018

References